Happy Lucky is a 2018 Indian Odia-language romantic action comedy film directed by Sundhanshu Sahu. The film stars Sambit Acharya and Jyoti Ranjan Nayak opposite Sasmita and Elina Samantray respectively in lead roles.
The film is an official remake of Tamil film Vettai.

Plot
The film's story is about twin brothers who fall in love with two sisters.

Cast
 Jyoti Ranjan Nayak
 Sambit Acharya
 Sasmita 
 Elina Samantray
 Mihir Das
 Bobby Mishra

Soundtrack
The music was composed by Prem Anand and the lyrics have written by Basantraj Samal.

Release
The audio was released at Municipality Kalyan Mandap, Chandrasekharpur at Odisha Television Limited’s Rasagola Mahotsav.
Which is released in 21 January 2018.

Box office
The film did well at the box office. The total box office collection of this movie was 4.50 crore.

References

2018 films
Twins in Indian films
2010s Odia-language films
Odia remakes of Tamil films
Films directed by Sudhanshu Sahu